The Next Indian general election in Rajasthan is expected to be held in or before May 2024 to elect the members of 18th Lok Sabha.

Party-wise summary

References

Indian general elections in Rajasthan
Rajasthan